PSKN (stands for Persatuan Sepakbola Kefamenanu) is a Indonesian football team based at Oemanu Field, Kefamenanu, North Central Timor Regency, East Nusa Tenggara. They currently competes in the Liga 3.

Players

Current squad

References

External links

Football clubs in Indonesia
Football clubs in East Nusa Tenggara